The Outsourced Self: Intimate Life in Market Times, by Arlie Russell Hochschild, was published in 2012. It focuses on the "emotional terms of engagement" individuals develop as they increasingly outsource tasks associated with intimate life.  These range from for-pay internet dating, long-distance elder care and take-out dinners to "rent-a-friends" and global commercial surrogacy.

References

External links 
 The Outsourced Life(NYTimes.com: May 5, 2012)

2012 non-fiction books
Social sciences books
Metropolitan Books books